Gigolettes of Paris (released in the United Kingdom as Tarnished Youth) is a 1933 American movie directed by Alphonse Martell, produced by Equitable Pictures, and starring Madge Bellamy and Gilbert Roland.

Martell, a French actor who had by then appeared in many small roles in American films, wrote the story and directed it, his only credits of the sort. The movie's original title was Gold Diggers of Paris but a lawsuit from Warner Bros. (which had released Gold Diggers of Broadway in 1929 and Gold DIggers of 1933 months before Martell's movie) prevented the use of the name. In 1938 Warner released a movie called Gold Diggers in Paris.

The film is about a romance between a salesgirl and a wealthy count as well as another man.

The film used RCA Photophone Recording.

Cast
Madge Bellamy
Gilbert Roland
Natalie Moorhead
Theodore Von Eltz
Molly O'Day
Henry Kolker
Paul Porcasi
Albert Conti
Maude Truax

References

1933 films
American romance films
1930s American films